Ghiyath al-Din, also transcribed as Ghiyāthu'd-Dīn, Ghiyasuddin, etc. is the name of many persons in the Islamic world. It may refer to:

People
Ghiyath ad-Din Muhammad Tapar, better known as Muhammad I (Seljuq sultan) (died 1118)
Ghiyath al-Din Abu'l-Fath Umar ibn Ibrahim Al-Nishapuri al-Khayyami, better known as Omar Khayyam, (1048–1131), Persian scientist and poet
Ghiyath al-Din Muhammad (fl. 1176–1200), ruler of the Ghorid dynasty in Khorāsān
Ghiyasuddin Iwaj Shah, (fl. 1210), ruler of Bengal
Ghīyāth al-Dīn Kaykhusraw bin Qilij Arslān, or Kaykhusraw I (died 1211), Seljuk Sultan of Rum
Ghīyāth al-Dīn Kaykhusraw bin Kayqubād, or Kaykhusraw II (died 1246), Seljuk Sultan of Rum
Ghīyāth al-Dīn Kaykhusraw bin Qilij Arslān, or Kaykhusraw III (died 1284), Seljuk Sultan of Rum
Ghiyas ud din Balban, (1200–1287), Turkic ruler of the Delhi Sultanate
Ghiyath al-Din Tughluq, (died 1325), founder of the Muslim Turkic Tughluq dynasty in India
Ghiyasuddin Bahadur Shah, (died 1328), ruler of Bengali kingdom of Lakhnauti
Ghiyas al-Din ibn Rashid al-Din, (died 1336), Ilkhanate politician
Tughluq Khan, (died 1389), Muslim Turkic ruler of the Tughlaq Dynasty
Baysunghur, (1397–1433) son and associate of the Timurid ruler Shah Rukh in Herat
Ghiyāth al-dīn Naqqāsh, (fl. 1419–1422), the diarist of a Persian embassy to China
Ghiyāth al-Dīn Jamshīd ibn Masʾūd al-Kāshī, or just Jamshīd al-Kāshī (c. 1380–1429), Persian astronomer and mathematician
Ghiyasuddin Azam Shah, (1390–1411), third Sultan of the first Iliyas Shahi dynasty of Bengal
Ghiyāth al-Dīn ʿAlī Iṣfahānī, fifteenth century, scholar in Badakhshān
Ghiyath Shah, (1469–1500), second Sultan of the Khilji dynasty of Malwa
Ghiyasuddin Mahmud Shah, (deposed 1538), last sultan of the Hussain Shahi dynasty of Bengal
Ghiyasuddin Jalal Shah (died 1563), ruler of Bengal
Muhammed Ghiya'as ud-din (fl. 1766–1773), Sultan of the Maldives
Musa Ghiatuddin Riayat Shah of Selangor (1893–1955), Sultan of Selangor
Ghayasuddin Siddiqui (born 1939?), British academic and political activist
Ghias-ud-din of Qazvin, 16th century Persian noble
 (born 1947), Iranian Shia Cleric

Places
Ghiyasuddin International School, Malé, Maldives. – School named after Sultan Muhammed Ghiya'as ud-din.

Arabic masculine given names